Sweden competed at the 2016 Summer Olympics in Rio de Janeiro, Brazil, from 3 to 20 August 2016. Swedish athletes have competed at every Summer Olympic Games in the modern era, except for the 1904 Summer Olympics in St. Louis. They extended their medal-winning streak to 47 straight Olympic Games by obtaining a silver in women's road race.

Medalists

The following Swedish competitors won medals at the games. In the by discipline sections below, medalists' names are bolded.

|  style="text-align:left; width:78%; vertical-align:top;"|

|  style="text-align:left; width:22%; vertical-align:top;"|

Competitors

| width=78% align=left valign=top |
The following is the list of number of competitors participating in the Games. Note that reserves in equestrian, football, handball and table tennis are not counted as athletes:

Archery

One Swedish archer has qualified for the women's individual recurve at the Olympics by virtue of a top six national finish at the 2016 Archery World Cup meet in Antalya, Turkey.

Athletics

Sixteen Swedish athletes have been selected to compete in the games. The SOK selected its athletes with a specific qualifying standard based on the results at the 2012 Summer Olympics, 2013 IAAF World Championships and the 2015 IAAF World Championships to ensure that the athlete can reach a top eight position. However, Melker Svärd Jacobsson who was scheduled to compete in men's pole vault had to withdraw before the games due to injury.

Track & road events

Field events
Men

Women

Badminton

Sweden has qualified one badminton player for the men's singles into the Olympic tournament. London 2012 Olympian Henri Hurskainen had claimed his Olympic spot as one of top 34 individual shuttlers in the BWF World Rankings as of 5 May 2016.

Boxing

Sweden has qualified one boxer to compete in the women's middleweight division into the Olympic boxing tournament. 2012 Olympian Anna Laurell Nash had claimed her Olympic spot with a semifinal victory at the 2016 European Qualification Tournament in Samsun, Turkey.

Canoeing

Slalom
Sweden has received a spare Olympic berth freed up by the Netherlands to send a canoeist competing in the men's K-1 class, as the next highest-ranked eligible individual, not yet qualified, at the 2016 European Canoe Slalom Championships in Liptovský Mikuláš, Slovakia, signifying the nation's debut in slalom canoeing.

Sprint
Sweden has qualified a single boat in men's K-1 200 m for the Games through the 2015 ICF Canoe Sprint World Championships. Meanwhile, two additional boats (women's K-1 200 m and women's K-2 500 m) were awarded to the Swedish squad by virtue of a top two national finish at the 2016 European Qualification Regatta in Duisburg, Germany.

On 25 July 2016, one additional boat was awarded to the Swedish squad in the men's K-2 200 m and one in women's K-1 500 m, as a response to the removal of five boats held by the Russians from the International Canoe Federation due to their previous doping bans and their implications in the "disappearing positive methodology" set out in the McClaren Report on Russia's state-sponsored doping. SOK decided to decline the spot in the men's K-2 200 m, but selected Karin Johansson for women's K-1 500 m.

Qualification Legend: FA = Qualify to final (medal); FB = Qualify to final B (non-medal)

Cycling

Road
Swedish riders qualified for the following three quota places in women's Olympic road race by virtue of their top 13 national finish in the 2016 UCI World Ranking (for women).

Mountain biking
Swedish mountain bikers qualified for one men's and women's quota place each into the Olympic cross-country race, as a result of the nation's nineteenth-place finish for men and sixteenth for women, respectively, in the UCI Olympic Ranking List of 25 May 2016. With Olympic selection criteria requiring riders to show top eight potential, the SOK had decided to nominate one mountain biker to the Olympic roster instead, which was awarded to Jenny Rissveds in women's cross-country.

Equestrian

Swedish equestrians have qualified a full squad in all three disciplines through the 2014 FEI World Equestrian Games, the 2015 European Dressage Championships and the 2015 European Eventing Championships. Mads Hendeliowitz (dressage), Linda Algotsson (eventing) and Charlotte Mordasini (jumping) were named as reserves. Reserve Linda Algotsson and her horse Fairnet stepped in to compete when Anna Nilsson's horse Luron got an airway infection.

Dressage
Swedish dressage team was named on 1 July 2016. Therese Nilshagen was originally selected for the team but her horse Dante Weltino was ill so she was replaced by Mads Hendeliowitz.

"#" indicates that the score of this rider does not count in the team competition, since only the best three results of a team are counted.

Eventing

"#" indicates that the score of this rider does not count in the team competition, since only the best three results of a team are counted.

Jumping

"TO" indicates that the rider only qualified for the team competition. "#" indicates that the score of this rider does not count in the team competition, since only the best three results of a team are counted.

Football

Summary

Men's tournament

Sweden's men's football team qualified for the Olympics by virtue of a top four finish and progressing to the semifinal match of the 2015 UEFA European Under-21 Championship in the Czech Republic.

Team roster

Group play

Women's tournament

The Swedish women's football team qualified for the Olympics by winning the gold medal and securing a lone outright berth at the UEFA Olympic Qualifying Tournament in the Netherlands.

Team roster

Group stage

Quarterfinal

Semifinal

Gold medal match

Golf

Sweden has entered four golfers (two per gender) into the Olympic tournament. David Lingmerth (world no. 48), Henrik Stenson (world no. 6), Pernilla Lindberg (world no. 90) and Anna Nordqvist (world no. 11) qualified directly among the top 60 eligible players for their respective individual events based on the IGF World Rankings as of 11 July 2016.

Gymnastics

Artistic
Sweden has entered one artistic gymnast into the Olympic competition. Emma Larsson had claimed her Olympic spot in the women's apparatus and all-around events at the Olympic Test Event in Rio de Janeiro.

Women

Larsson was ranked 65th in the uneven bars event, 27th in the balance beam event and 42nd in the floor event.

Handball

Summary

Men's tournament

The Swedish men's handball team qualified for the Olympics by virtue of a top two finish at the second meet of the Olympic Qualification Tournament in Malmö.

Team roster
The final squad of 14 players were presented on 6 July 2016.

Group stage

Women's tournament

Sweden's women's handball team qualified for the Olympics by virtue of a top two finish at the third meet of the Olympic Qualification Tournament in Astrakhan, Russia.

Team roster
The final squad of 14 players were presented on 5 July 2016.

Group play

Quarterfinal

Judo

Sweden has qualified four judokas for each of the following weight classes at the Games. Brothers Robin and Martin Pacek, along with London 2012 Olympian Marcus Nyman, were ranked among the top 22 eligible judokas for men in the IJF World Rankings of 30 May 2016, while Mia Hermansson at women's half-middleweight (63 kg) earned a continental quota spot from the European region, as the highest-ranked Swedish judoka outside of direct qualifying position.

Rowing

Sweden has qualified one boat in the women's single sculls for the Olympics at the 2015 FISA World Championships in Lac d'Aiguebelette, France.

Qualification Legend: FA=Final A (medal); FB=Final B (non-medal); FC=Final C (non-medal); FD=Final D (non-medal); FE=Final E (non-medal); FF=Final F (non-medal); SA/B=Semifinals A/B; SC/D=Semifinals C/D; SE/F=Semifinals E/F; QF=Quarterfinals; R=Repechage

Sailing

Swedish sailors have qualified one boat in each of the following classes through the 2014 ISAF Sailing World Championships, the individual fleet Worlds, and European qualifying regattas. In December 2015, the Swedish Olympic Committee (SOK) had announced the names of six crews to be selected to the Rio regatta, including 2012 Olympic champion Max Salminen, while Laser sailor Jesper Stålheim joined the fleet four months later in another Olympic selection.

Men

Women

M = Medal race; EL = Eliminated – did not advance into the medal race

Shooting

Swedish shooters have achieved quota places for the following events by virtue of their best finishes at the 2014 and 2015 ISSF World Championships, the 2015 ISSF World Cup series, and European Championships or Games, as long as they obtained a minimum qualifying score (MQS) by 31 March 2016.

On 14 November 2015, skeet shooters Stefan Nilsson and Marcus Svensson were among the initial batch of Swedish athletes to assure their selection to the Olympic team. Initially, Sweden secured a quota place in the women's 10 m air rifle, but the Swedish Olympic Committee chose to exchange it with the men's double trap instead based on performances throughout the qualifying period. The slot was awarded to London 2012 silver medalist Håkan Dahlby.

Qualification Legend: Q = Qualify for the next round; q = Qualify for the bronze medal (shotgun)

Swimming

Swedish swimmers have so far achieved qualifying standards in the following events (up to a maximum of 2 swimmers in each event at the Olympic Qualifying Time (OQT), and potentially 1 at the Olympic Selection Time (OST)):

A total of eleven Swedish swimmers (two men and nine women) were selected to the Olympic team with Therese Alshammar becoming the first female ever to compete in her sixth straight Games. The swimming roster also featured current world record holder Sarah Sjöström in the women's 100 m butterfly.

Men

Women

Table tennis

Sweden has entered three athletes into the table tennis competition at the Games. Pär Gerell and Li Fen secured one of the ten available Olympic berths each in the men's and women's singles, respectively, while Matilda Ekholm rounded out the Olympic lineup by winning the repechage play-off match at the European Qualification Tournament in Halmstad. Kristian Karlsson was automatically selected among the top 22 eligible players to join Gerell in the men's singles based on the ITTF Olympic Rankings.

Mattias Karlsson was awarded the third spot to build the men's team for the Games by virtue of a top 10 national finish outside the continental zones in the ITTF Olympic Rankings. Anton Källberg has been selected as reserve in the men's team event.

Taekwondo

Sweden entered two athletes into the taekwondo competition at the Olympics. Nikita Glasnović and 2012 Olympian Elin Johansson qualified automatically for in their respective classes by finishing in the top 6 WTF Olympic rankings.

Tennis

Sweden has entered one tennis player into the Olympic tournament. Johanna Larsson (world no. 55) qualified directly for the women's singles as one of the top 56 eligible players in the WTA World Rankings as of 6 June 2016.

Triathlon

Sweden has entered one triathlete to compete at the Games. London 2012 silver medalist Lisa Nordén was ranked among the top 40 eligible triathletes in the women's event based on the ITU Olympic Qualification List as of 15 May 2016.

Weightlifting

Sweden received an unused quota place from IWF to send a female weightlifter to the Olympics, as a response to the vacancy of women's quota places in the individual World Rankings and to the "multiple positive cases" of doping on several nations. This marked Sweden's historic debut in women's weightlifting at the Games.

Wrestling

Sweden has qualified a total of seven wrestlers for each of the following weight classes into the Olympic competition. Three of them finished among the top six to book Olympic spots each in all women's freestyle events (except 48, 63, & 75 kg) at the 2015 World Championships. Meanwhile, four further wrestlers had claimed the remaining Olympic slots to round out the Swedish roster in separate World Qualification Tournaments; two of them at the initial meet in Ulaanbaatar and two more at the final meet in Istanbul.

Men's Greco-Roman

Women's freestyle

See also
Sweden at the 2016 Summer Paralympics

References

External links 

 
Swedish Olympic Team

Olympics
Nations at the 2016 Summer Olympics
2016